Juncus biglumis, called the two-flowered rush, is a species of flowering plant in the genus Juncus, native to the subarctic and subalpine Northern Hemisphere. It has three divergent genetic lineages that may represent cryptic species.

References

biglumis
Taxa named by Carl Linnaeus
Plants described in 1753